Sebastián Ceballos (born 1 July 1992) is a Chilean handball player for ABC BRAGA and the Chilean national team.

References

1992 births
Living people
Chilean male handball players
Handball players at the 2015 Pan American Games
Handball players at the 2019 Pan American Games
Pan American Games silver medalists for Chile
Pan American Games bronze medalists for Chile
Pan American Games medalists in handball
Expatriate handball players
Chilean expatriate sportspeople in Spain
Liga ASOBAL players
South American Games bronze medalists for Chile
South American Games medalists in handball
Competitors at the 2018 South American Games
Medalists at the 2015 Pan American Games
Medalists at the 2019 Pan American Games
21st-century Chilean people
20th-century Chilean people